Young Scottish Socialists (YSS) is the youth wing of the Scottish Socialist Party. They are an anti-capitalist, anti-racist and anti-globalisation organisation which stands for the creation of an independent, socialist Scotland.

The organisation was previously known as the Scottish Socialist Youth (SSY) and appears to have undergone a renaming and rebranding in October, 2015. All historical references to the YSS are referred to as the organisation was known at the time of being referenced.

Campaigning 

In 2001 SSY began campaigning for a change to drug laws, including arguing for the legalisation of cannabis, They later broadened to demand new thinking on approaches to all drugs, prompted by the 2009 banning of mephedrone.

They were involved in the campaign against the G8 summit at Gleneagles. In June 2007, five members of the SSY were arrested at Faslane as part of the Faslane 365 campaign They were also heavily involved in campaigning for the SSP during the 2005 general election and in the 2007 Scottish Parliament and council elections where a number of members stood as SSP candidates.

Currently they are campaigning against low pay for young workers, and are arguing for an £8 per hour minimum wage regardless of age. They have produced workers' rights cards to let young workers know what they are entitled to and how to get it. In November 2007, the SSY organised a protect in conjunction with the SSP LGBT Network against Stagecoach, after two young gay men were threatened with being thrown off a bus as one had their arm around the other.

The results of the 2010 UK election resulting in a coalition government led by the Tories, has led to the SSY campaigning against the new government and the cuts that they are inflicting. SSY received national media attention in 2010 when they organised a demonstration at short notice to coincide with David Cameron's first visit to Scotland as Prime Minister, on 14 May 2010.

Recently, YSS have also been involved in anti-fascist activity in Scotland, notably helping organise mobilisations against the far-right Scottish Defence League in Glasgow, Edinburgh, and Kilmarnock, as well as participating in UKUnCut actions targeting major retailers which practice large scale tax avoidance.

Structure 

Although the YSS is affiliated to the Scottish Socialist Party, it is an autonomous body and is open to all socialists in Scotland (except members of opposing parties) under the age of 27.

The day-to-day running of the YSS is the responsibility of the National Organiser, assisted by the National Executive Committee which plays a leadership role. The NEC is elected at the annual National Conference with its membership split equally between men and women. The National Organiser is also elected at the conference. Additionally, SSY has branches across Scotland that conduct activity in their area.

SSY held their tenth annual conference in Glasgow in July 2011.

Women's Group 

SSY had a self-organised women's group, to which all young women are invited. The aim of the Women's Group is to create a space for young socialist women to talk about the issues that affect them. The Women's Group feel that, in a male-dominated environment, young women can be sidelined and may feel that their opinion is less valid. The SSY Women's Group aims to give young women confidence in their abilities.

At the SSY Conference 2005, the Women's Group decided that their main campaign would be on sex education, in particular discouraging and campaigning against abstinence-only education, which was run in some state schools at the expense of the Scottish Government. Their campaign, "Fuck Abstinence!", involved giving information on reproductive rights to young women denied adequate sex education.

References

External links 

 Facebook

Socialists
Scottish Socialist Party